A sleep study is a test that records the activity of the body during sleep. There are five main types of sleep studies that use different methods to test for different sleep characteristics and disorders. These include simple sleep studies, polysomnography, multiple sleep latency tests (MSLTs), maintenance of wakefulness tests (MWTs), and home sleep tests (HSTs). In medicine, sleep studies have been useful in identifying and ruling out various sleep disorders. Sleep studies have also been valuable to psychology, in which they have provided insight into brain activity and the other physiological factors of both sleep disorders and normal sleep. This has allowed further research to be done on the relationship between sleep and behavioral and psychological factors.

Utility
Depending on the method being used, sleep studies can help diagnose or rule out the following disorders:

 Sleep-related breathing disorders, such as sleep apnea
 Sleep-related seizure disorders
 Sleep-related movement disorders, such as periodic limb movement disorder, which is repeated muscle twitching of the feet, legs, or arms during sleep. Sleep studies may be used to diagnose or rule out restless legs syndrome (RLS). However, RLS usually is diagnosed based on signs and symptoms, medical history, and a physical exam.
 Problems sleeping at night (insomnia): caused by stress, depression, hunger, physical discomfort, or other problem.
 Sleep disorders that cause extreme daytime tiredness, such as narcolepsy or circadian rhythm sleep disorders.
 Problems with nighttime behaviors, such as sleepwalking, night terrors, or bed-wetting
 Bruxism or grinding of the teeth during sleep
 Problems sleeping during the day because of working at night or rotating shift work. This sleep problem is called shift work sleep disorder.
 Sleep studies can also determine problems with stages of sleep. The two primary categories of sleep are non-rapid eye movement (NREM) and rapid eye movement sleep (REM). Normally, four to five series of NREM and REM make up a night's sleep. A change in this cycle may make it hard to sleep soundly.

Types
The most common sleep studies are:

Polysomnogram
Polysomnography records several body functions during sleep, including brain activity, eye movement, oxygen and carbon dioxide blood levels, heart rate and rhythm, breathing rate and rhythm, the flow of air through the mouth and nose, snoring, body muscle movements, and chest and belly movement. These tests are typically done at night in a hospital or sleep center. Polysomnogram tests can give insight into what issue is occurring.

Multiple sleep latency test (MSLT)
The MSLT measures, by several nap opportunities in one day, how long it takes a person to fall asleep. It also determines whether REM sleep appears upon falling asleep. It is usually performed immediately after an overnight study. This test is the standard to test for narcolepsy and idiopathic hypersomnia.

Maintenance of wakefulness test (MWT)
This test measures whether a person can stay awake during a time when she or he is normally awake. Like the MSLT, the MWT is performed in a sleep diagnostic center over 4 - 5 nap periods. A mean sleep onset latency of less than 10 minutes is suggestive of excessive daytime sleepiness.

Home sleep test (HST) 
These typically include the individual whose sleep is being studied receiving a portable monitor and may include other items such as a finger clip and an airflow sensor. Items measured include oxygen saturation, heart rate, airflow, body movement, time spent snoring, sleep position, and brain waves.

Sleep questionnaires
 Tayside children's sleep questionnaire: A ten-item questionnaire for sleep disorders in children aged between one and five years old.
 Children's Sleep Habits Questionnaire.
 Cleveland Adolescent Sleepiness Questionnaire (CASQ): There are 16 items to measure extreme sleepiness during the day in adolescents aged 11–17 years old.

Sleep study in psychology 
Sleep studies have been imperative for the empirical research of sleep psychology. The area of sleep psychology evaluates the physiological, and behavioral factors of normal sleep and sleep disorders along with the neuroscience and brain-wave activity associated with sleep, as well as the study of circadian rhythms.

Administers of sleep studies 
Sleep Specialists are doctors that are board certified in sleep medicine. Doctors qualified to order a sleep study include:

 Primary care physician

A doctor who provides first contact for a person with a health concern.

 Sleep specialists

Board-certified sleep medicine doctors have undergone special training and testing to ensure they can diagnose all sleep-related disorders, including sleep apnea.

 Neurologist

The neurologist treats disorders that affect the brain, spinal cord, and nerves.

 Psychiatrists

A medical practitioner specializing in the diagnosis and treatment of mental illness.

 Pulmonologists

A medical practitioner specializing in the diagnosis and treatment of lung and breathing disorders.

References

External links
 Sleep Studies on National Sleep Foundation website
 E/M Coding and the Documentation Guidelines: Putting It All Together on AAFP website

Sleep